Heterophyllaea is a genus of two species of  shrubs in the family Rubiaceae, native to Bolivia and Argentina. 

Heterophyllaea pustulata also known as cegadera contains an unknown toxin that causes photosensitization in sheep and cows. It can grow to between 2 and 3 meters in height and is typically found in northwest Argentina at an altitude between 2,500 and 3,000 meters above sea level. 

Species
 Heterophyllaea lycioides (Rusby) Sandwith 
 Heterophyllaea pustulata Hook.f.

References 

Rubiaceae genera
Coussareeae
Taxa named by William Jackson Hooker